The voiced pharyngeal approximant or fricative is a type of consonantal sound, used in some spoken languages. Epiglottals and epiglotto-pharyngeals are often mistakenly taken to be pharyngeal.

Although traditionally placed in the fricative row of the IPA chart,  is usually an approximant. The IPA symbol itself is ambiguous, but no language is known to make a phonemic distinction between fricatives and approximants at this place of articulation.

Features
Features of the voiced pharyngeal approximant fricative:

Occurrence
Pharyngeal consonants are not widespread. Sometimes, a pharyngeal approximant develops from a uvular approximant. Many languages that have been described as having pharyngeal fricatives or approximants turn out on closer inspection to have epiglottal consonants instead. For example, the candidate  sound in Arabic and standard Hebrew (not modern Hebrew – Israelis generally pronounce this as a glottal stop) has been variously described as a voiced epiglottal fricative, an epiglottal approximant, or a pharyngealized glottal stop.

See also
 Guttural
 Index of phonetics articles
 Voiced uvular fricative
 Glottal stop

Citations

General references

External links
 

Pharyngeal consonants
Pulmonic consonants
Voiced oral consonants